Siegmund Jakob Baumgarten (14 March 1706, Wolmirstedt, Duchy of Magdeburg – 4 July 1757, Halle) was a German Protestant theologian. He was a brother to philosopher Alexander Gottlieb Baumgarten (1714–1762).

Biography
Baumgarten studied theology at the University of Halle, and in 1728 the 22-year-old Baumgarten, a Hallensian Pietist and bibliophile, was appointed as minister of the "Marktkirche Unser Lieben Frauen" (Market Church of Our Dear Lady). In 1730 he became an associate professor at Halle, where in 1734 he was appointed a full professor of theology. In 1748 he was named as university rector.  At the end of his life he translated encyclopedic articles and biographies from English into German.

Baumgarten was a follower of the philosophical teachings of Christian Wolff (1679-1754), and is regarded as a transitional theologian from the Pietism of Philipp Jakob Spener (1635-1705) and August Hermann Francke (1663-1727) to that of modern rationalism. He was a prodigious writer and published works on exegesis, hermeneutics, dogmatics and history. He was the editor of the first sixteen volumes of the Allgemeine Welthistorie (General World History), which after his death, was continued by his assistant Johann Salomo Semler (1725-1791).

Other noted works by Baumgarten include:
 Auszug der Kirchengeschichte (Compendium of church history), Halle 1743–63 (three volumes) 
 Geschichte der Religionsparteien (History of religious parties), Halle 1755 
 Nachrichten von merkwürdigen Büchern (Notices of extraordinary books), Halle 1752–57 (12 volumes) 
 Nachrichten von einer hallischen Bibliothek, (Notices from the Halle Library), Halle 1748–58

Notes

References 
  English translation
 Schaff Encyclopedia (biographical information)
 Parts of this article are based on a translation of an article from the German Wikipedia.

1706 births
1757 deaths
People from Wolmirstedt
People from the Duchy of Magdeburg
German Lutheran theologians
18th-century German Protestant theologians
German male non-fiction writers
University of Halle alumni
Academic staff of the University of Halle
18th-century German male writers